Hieronymus Schlick was a Bohemian count who authorised the minting of Joachimsthalers, after Joachimsthal, the valley in which the silver was mined. Joachimsthalers was later shortened to thaler, the origin of the word "dollar".

References 

15th-century Bohemian people
Medieval Bohemian nobility